Jocelyn Joe-Strack, (Daqualama Da-kal-a-ma  Aishihik First Nation) is an Indigenous Canadian scientist.

Life 
She graduated from University of Victoria, and  University of Northern British Columbia.

She is a microbiologist, and hydrologist at Yukon University. She is research chair in Indigenous Knowledge. She was selected for a TikTok accelerator program.

References 

University of Victoria alumni